The 2008 season was the 60th season of competitive football in Iraq, since the creation of the Iraq Football Association in 1948.

National Team

Ambassadors of Peace match

2010 World Cup Qualifiers

Group 1

U-21 National Team

Norway - Middle East U21 National Team Tournament

Youth team

Youth team friendlies

Inter Cup 2008

AFC Youth Championship

U-16 Team

U-16 Team Friendlies

Niigata U-16 Tournament

Domestic clubs in international tournaments

2008 AFC Champions League

Group B

Group D

Arab Champions League 

Iraq has 1 spot. The spot was given to the 3rd Placed team of the Iraqi Premier League 2007-08.

Round 32

Round 16

References

External links
iraq-football.net